Ryeish Green is a small hamlet in the civil parish of Shinfield, Berkshire, England, 4 miles south of Reading.  It is located next to Spencers Wood and sometimes considered a part of that village.

The only road in the hamlet is Hyde End Lane, which was an unnamed road until recently.

It is the location of Oakbank School. The site was previously the location of Ryeish Green School, which served as the local polling station for many years.  The polling station was moved to Spencer Wood in 2008.

Hamlets in Berkshire
Borough of Wokingham